The  European and Mediterranean Book Prize  is a European literary award. It was created in 2013 by the organizers of the European and Mediterranean Book Days in partnership with the European Commission.

Jury 
 Jean-Claude Augé
 Yahia Belaskri
 Paul Balta
 Sheena Chraïbi
 Florence Raut
 Odile Cazenave
 Michèle Guyot-Rose

Honorees
 2014: Éric Fottorino
 2015: Yahia Belaskri
 2016: Robert Solé
 2017: Olivier Weber
 2018: Jean-Marie Blas de Roblès
 2020 : Leïla Bahsaïn and Alexandre Ferraga.

Awards established in 2013
European literary awards
French literary awards
Literary awards honoring writers
2013 establishments in France